Rafa'at wa Awal-i-Martabat Maharaja Sri Chait Singh Sahib Bahadur (died 29 March 1810), commonly known as Chait Singh, was a ruler of Kingdom of Benaras in northern India. 

Maharaja Balwant Singh's elder son, Rafa'at wa Awal-i-Martabat Raja Sri Chait Singh Sahib Bahadur, succeeded to the throne as the next Raja of Benares in 1770. Although the Nawab still wished to hold total suzerainty over the zamindari, the British authorities encouraged him to recognise Chet Singh as zamindar in 1773. Two years later, the Nawab, by now fed up with British interference, transferred the domain to the Company under the direct control of the Governor-General of India, Warren Hastings. Under the new British terms, Chet Singh was forced to contribute cavalry and maintenance grants for the company's sepoy battalions. The Raja refused to do this and he began to secretly correspond with enemies of the Company in hopes of forcibly breaking the increasing control of company in India. The company discovered his plan with the help of some traitors and tried to place him under house arrest in August 1781, pending interview with Hastings.

Revolt of Benares 
Hastings came for the interview and as the Raja and his men were waiting for this chance, they defeated the Company's troops, killed British officers and arrested Hastings himself, but they were advised by Munshi Sadanand(ancestor of Sampoornanand) against killing Hastings and this proved to be a fatal mistake. Hastings escaped, with the help of the traitors and left Benaras disguised as a women. The Raja gathered his small forces, appealing for assistance against Britishers, from local rulers, who, except Raja Fateh Bahadur Shahi, did nothing. Maharaja Chet singh's last hope was the raja of gwalior who also sighed a treaty in which maharaja gave him land, protection and labourers for making ghats and in return he promised to give troops when needed but he did not help him and he lured him on pretext of helping him but arrested him and detained him in Gwalior after the battle. In various battles with the company's forces, Chet Singh's troops were defeated, the rebellion crushed with the help of traitors, several patriot warriors fell in battlefields, their family members and innocent citizens were and the state confiscated and given to Avsaan Singh in reward for his treachery, but revolt restarted. Then Company was forced to install the nephew of Maharaja Chet Singh (son of his sister Maharajkumari Padma Kuwar), Rafa'at wa Awal-i-Martabat Raja Sri Mahip Narayan Singh Sahib Bahadur on 14 September 1781 and free his father Babu Durgvijay Singh from their custody who was arrested for assisting Maharaja Chait Singh and fighting against the Company. Chet Singh was granted a jagir for a while until it was later confiscated.

Later life 
He died in Gwalior on 29 March 1810, leaving three sons. His Chattri is still at Gwalior. Carved stone from Chait Singh's palace was later taken and incorporated into the palace of the Maharajas of Cossimbazar.

Aftermath 
Chait Singh's nephew, Maharaja Sri Mahip Narayan Singh Sahib Bahadur, succeeded his maternal uncle on 14 September 1781 under the terms of the British East India Company, which were that he should serve to dispense justice within his domains and make an annual contribution of 40 lakhs.The incident greatly tarnished Hastings' image and capability, leading to a failed attempt to impeach him by the British parliament.

References

Maharajas of Benares
1810 deaths
Narayan dynasty